Dijkse Boys was a Dutch amateur association football club from Helmond.

The club was founded on May 8, 1948 and has played at amateur level in all its history, making it the second team in the town after professional crosstown rivals Helmond Sport. The club was part of the Hoofdklasse league in the 2009–10 season, completing it in fifth place in the Sunday B group, and then winning promotion to the newly established Topklasse league for the inaugural 2010–11 season through playoffs.

After a few months into the 2010-11 season, the main sponsor withdrew, leaving Dijkse Boys in financial trouble. In the turmoil, the club lost a KNVB Cup match against SC Genemuiden 1-9. The day after the defeat, Dijkse Boys decided to withdraw from the Topklasse because of financial problems.

The club was relegated to Hoofdklasse in 2011. In 2012 the club started new season in the Eerste Klasse. It folded in January 2013.

Current squad 
2010–11 season

References

External links 
 Official site

Defunct football clubs in the Netherlands
Football clubs in Helmond
Association football clubs established in 1948
1948 establishments in the Netherlands